Dong Zhao (156 – 4 July 236), courtesy name Gongren, was an official of the state of Cao Wei during the Three Kingdoms period of China. He previously served under the warlords Yuan Shao, Zhang Yang and Cao Cao consecutively during the late Eastern Han dynasty.

Service under Yuan Shao
Dong Zhao was a xiaolian and served as a county official in his early years under the warlord Yuan Shao before being promoted to a military adviser. He was appointed as the governing official of several counties and commanderies in Yuan Shao's territories and governed them well. However, Yuan Shao listened to slanderous rumours and began to doubt Dong Zhao's loyalty towards him. Dong Zhao was fearful that Yuan Shao might kill him and he fled.

Service under Zhang Yang
Dong Zhao wanted to flee to where Emperor Xian was. On the way, he passed by Henei Commandery, which was governed by the warlord Zhang Yang. Zhang Yang let Dong Zhao join him and appointed him as an official. In 192, when Cao Cao wanted to seek permission to pass through Zhang Yang's territory to receive Emperor Xian from exile, Zhang Yang initially refused, but after Dong Zhao's persuasion he agreed. Dong Zhao followed Cao Cao to receive the emperor.

Service under Cao Cao
In 196, Emperor Xian met Cao Cao, who received him with all due respect after heeding Dong Zhao's suggestion. After the death of Zhang Yang, Dong Zhao went to persuade Zhang Yang's followers to join Cao Cao. By then, Dong Zhao had formally entered Cao Cao's service. In 199, after Cao Cao seized back Xu Province from Liu Bei, Dong Zhao was appointed as the Governor of Xu Province. Subsequently, Dong Zhao followed Cao Cao on the campaigns against Yuan Shao and the Wuhuan tribes and was promoted to even higher official positions. In 216, Dong Zhao aided Cao Cao by persuading Emperor Xian to confer on Cao Cao the title of a vassal king – King of Wei. In 219, while Guan Yu was attacking Fancheng, Sun Quan agreed to send reinforcements to help the entrapped Cao Ren. To keep things secret, Dong Zhao proposed a trick of tying the messages written on paper onto arrows which were fired into the city. When Cao Ren's troops heard that Sun Quan was willing to send reinforcements, the army's morale was boosted and eventually culminated in Guan Yu's defeat.

Service in Wei
In 220, Cao Pi usurped the throne from Emperor Xian and established the state of Cao Wei to replace the Han dynasty. Throughout the reign of Cao Pi and his successor Cao Rui, Dong Zhao played an important role in state affairs by providing suggestions and advice to the emperors. He managed to predict the movements and decisions of the enemy accurately a few times and saved the Wei armies from defeat, such as during a campaign against the rival state of Eastern Wu in which Dong Zhao predicted correctly that there would be an ambush. Highly recognised for his contributions to the state, Dong Zhao was promoted to even higher official positions. In 236, Dong Zhao died at the age of 81 (by East Asian age reckoning) and was given a posthumous title of a marquis.

See also
 Lists of people of the Three Kingdoms

Notes

References

 Chen, Shou (3rd century). Records of the Three Kingdoms (Sanguozhi).
 Pei, Songzhi (5th century). Annotations to Records of the Three Kingdoms (Sanguozhi zhu).

Officials under Cao Cao
156 births
236 deaths
Cao Wei politicians
Politicians from Heze
Han dynasty politicians from Shandong
Political office-holders in Hebei
Political office-holders in Jiangsu